The 1975 Colgate Red Raiders football team was an American football team that represented Colgate University as an independent during the 1975 NCAA Division I football season. In its eighth and final season under head coach Neil Wheelwright, the team compiled a 6–4 record. Bruce Basile and James Gregory were the team captains. 

The team played its home games at Andy Kerr Stadium in Hamilton, New York.

Schedule

Leading players 
Two trophies were awarded to the Red Raiders' most valuable players in 1975: 
 Bruce Basile, quarterback, received the Andy Kerr Trophy, awarded to the most valuable offensive player.
 Mark Murphy, defensive back, received the Hal W. Lahar Trophy, awarded to the most valuable defensive player.

Statistical leaders for the 1975 Red Raiders included: 
 Rushing: Pat Healy, 732 yards and 5 touchdowns on 143 attempts
 Passing: Bruce Basile, 828 yards, 49 completions and 5 touchdowns on 101 attempts
 Receiving: Brion Applegate, 510 yards and 2 touchdowns on 25 receptions
 Total offense: Bruce Basile, 1,249 yards (828 passing, 421 rushing)
 Scoring: Jerry Andrewlavage, 47 points from 23 PATs and 8 field goals
 All-purpose yards: Henry White, 982 yards (619 rushing, 335 kickoff returning, 28 receiving)

References

Colgate
Colgate Raiders football seasons
Colgate Red Raiders football